Junction station usually refers to a railway station situated either on (in German this is called a Keilbahnhof) or close to a junction where lines to several destinations diverge. The usual minimum is three incoming lines. At a station with platforms running from left to right, the minimum to qualify as a junction station would usually be one line on the left and two on the right (or vice versa).

This is not to be confused with a station where there is one through line, but single track on one side while double track on the other. In this case, all trains passing through the station can reach only one destination as their next station.

Commonly, junction stations have multiple platform faces to enable trains for multiple destinations to stand at the station at the same time, but this is not necessary.

There are many stations with the word 'junction' in their title, such as those below:

In Australia
Bondi Junction railway station
Eagle Junction railway station

In Canada
Hervey-Jonction railway station
Sudbury Junction railway station
Trenton Junction, Ontario railway station

In India

Gaya Junction
Varanasi Junction

In Indonesia

Central Java

East Java

Jakarta

North Sumatra

West Java

In Ireland

Historical 
Fintona Junction railway station
Bundoran Junction railway station
Cookstown Junction railway station
Ballyclare Junction railway station
Limavady Junction railway station
Ballynahinch Junction railway station

In Use 
Howth Junction railway station
Limerick Junction railway station
Manulla Junction railway station

In Spain
 Martorell Enllaç station, on the Llobregat–Anoia Line
 Empalme station on the Valencia Metro
 Maçanet-Massanes railway station, previously called Empalme

In the United Kingdom

Abergavenny Junction railway station
Abingdon Junction railway station
Alton Heights Junction railway station
Alyth Junction railway station
Bala Junction railway station
Barnstaple Junction railway station
Beckenham Junction station
Boscarne Junction railway station
Bowling Junction railway station (West Yorkshire)
Broom Junction railway station
Buildwas Junction railway station
Burscough Junction railway station
Chard Junction railway station
Clapham Junction railway station
Coaley Junction railway station
Coombe Junction Halt railway station
Dalry Junction railway station
Dalston Junction railway station
Derby Junction railway station
Dovey Junction railway station
Effingham Junction railway station
Egginton Junction railway station
Evercreech Junction railway station
Folkestone Junction railway station
Georgemas Junction railway station
Grange Court Junction railway station
Halwill Junction railway station
Haxey Junction railway station
Holt Junction railway station
Ilkeston Junction and Cossall railway station
Junction Road railway station
Junction Road Halt railway station
Killin Junction railway station
Llandudno Junction railway station
Loughborough Junction railway station
Lydbrook Junction railway station
Lydney Junction railway station
Maud Junction railway station
Maybole Junction railway station
Middleton Junction railway station
Millwall Junction railway station
Mitcham Junction station
Morebath Junction railway station
Motherwell railway station
Northolt Junction railway station
Norwood Junction railway station
Pen-y-Mount Junction railway station
Reedness Junction railway station
Riccarton Junction railway station
Roudham Junction railway station
Royton Junction railway station
St Helens Junction railway station
Seaton Junction railway station
Severn Tunnel Junction railway station
Settle Junction railway station
Sidmouth Junction railway station
Smallbrook Junction railway station
Stepney Junction railway station
Stourbridge Junction railway station
Swanwick Junction railway station
Tiverton Junction railway station
Todd Lane Junction railway station
Tooting Junction railway station
Tryfan Junction railway station
Verney Junction railway station
Watford Junction railway station
Whitacre Junction railway station
Willesden Junction railway station
Woodhall Junction railway station
Yarwell Junction railway station
Yeovil Junction railway station

In the United States
Ancona Station (Illinois), no longer used for service
Broadway Junction (BMT Canarsie Line)
Joliet Union Station, Illinois
Princeton Junction (NJT station)
Secaucus Junction, New Jersey
Wayne Junction, Pennsylvania
Vancouver, Washington (Amtrak station)
Jamaica (LIRR station)

In Thailand

Historical 

 U Tapao Junction (Songkhla Province)

In Use 

 Bangsue Junction

 Ban Phachi Junction
 Ban Dara Junction
 Kaeng Khoi Junction
 Thanon Chira Junction
 Bua Yai Junction
 Chachoengsao Junction
 Khlong Sip Kao Junction
 Si Racha Junction
 Khao Chi Chan Junction
 Taling Chan Junction
 Nong Pladuk Junction
 Ban Thung Pho Junction
 Thung Song Junction
 Khao Chum Thong Junction
 Haad Yai Junction
 Nong Bua Junction
 Ban Phai Na Bun Junction
 Chumphon Junction

Lists of railway stations